Glenn Anton "Doc" Rivers (born October 13, 1961) is an American professional basketball coach and former player who is the head coach for the Philadelphia 76ers of the National Basketball Association (NBA).

After playing for Marquette University for three seasons, Rivers was drafted by the Atlanta Hawks of the National Basketball Association in 1983. He played point guard for the Hawks from 1983 to 1991 and later played for the Los Angeles Clippers, the New York Knicks, and the San Antonio Spurs. Rivers was an NBA All-Star in 1988.

In 1999, Rivers began his NBA coaching career when he was hired as head coach of the Orlando Magic. Rivers was named the 2000 NBA Coach of the Year in his first season with the Magic. Rivers went on to coach the Boston Celtics, the Los Angeles Clippers, and the Philadelphia 76ers. He won an NBA championship in 2008 as head coach of the Celtics.

High school and college career 
Rivers was a McDonald's All-American for Proviso East High School in the Chicago metropolitan area and then attended Marquette University.

Rivers was given his nickname of "Doc" by then-Marquette assistant coach Rick Majerus. Rivers attended a summer basketball camp wearing a "Dr. J" t-shirt of Philadelphia 76ers player Julius Erving. Majerus called him "Doc" and the players at camp followed suit. The nickname source has also been attributed to then-Marquette coach Al McGuire.

Rivers represented the United States with the national team in the 1982 FIBA World Championship, in which he led the team to the silver medal, despite missing the last shot in the final, which could have given the title to his team.

After his third season at Marquette, Rivers was drafted in the second round (31st overall) of the 1983 NBA draft by the Atlanta Hawks. He graduated from Marquette while completing course work as an NBA player.

Professional career 

Rivers played point guard for the Atlanta Hawks from 1983 to 1991, assisting star Dominique Wilkins as the team found great regular season success. Rivers' first NBA start was against Erving, who referred to Rivers as "Doc" and "made [him] feel like a million bucks".

He averaged a double-double for the 1986–87 season with 12.8 points and 10.0 assists per game. In 1988, Rivers played in the NBA All-Star Game. He received the J. Walter Kennedy Citizenship Award in 1990.

Rivers later spent one year as a starter for the Los Angeles Clippers (1991–1992), two years playing for the New York Knicks (1992–1994), and two years playing for the San Antonio Spurs (1994–1996). Rivers retired after the 1996 season. During his career, he averaged 10.9 points, 5.7 assists, and 3 rebounds per game.

Coaching career

Orlando Magic (1999–2003)
Rivers began his coaching career with the Orlando Magic in 1999, where he coached for more than four NBA seasons. Rivers won the Coach of the Year award in 2000 after his first year with the Magic. Despite having been picked to finish last in that year's standings, Rivers led the Magic close to a playoff berth.

During the Magic's free agency spending spree in the summer of 2000, Rivers tried to assemble a "Big Three" team in the NBA. The Magic were courting free agent Tim Duncan, who came close to signing with the Magic and teaming up with fellow stars Grant Hill and Tracy McGrady. However, Duncan re-signed with the San Antonio Spurs due to Rivers' strict policy of family members not being allowed to travel in the team's plane.

The Magic made the postseason in Rivers's next three years as head coach, but he was fired in 2003 after a 1–10 start to the season.

Boston Celtics (2004–2013)

After spending a year working as a commentator for the NBA on ABC (calling the 2004 Finals with Al Michaels), he was hired by the Boston Celtics as their head coach in 2004. During his first years with the Celtics, he was criticized by many in the media for his coaching style, most vociferously by Bill Simmons, who in 2006 publicly called for Rivers to be fired in his columns.

As a result of the Celtics' 109–93 victory over the New York Knicks on January 21, 2008, Rivers, as the coach of the team with the best winning percentage in the Eastern Conference, earned the honor to coach the East for the 2008 NBA All-Star Game in New Orleans.

On June 17, 2008, Rivers won his first NBA Championship as a head coach after defeating the Los Angeles Lakers in six games. The Celtics needed an NBA record 26 postseason games to win it. Rivers played for the team that held the previous record for most games played in a single postseason: the 1994 New York Knicks played 25 postseason games.

Rivers led the Celtics to the 2010 NBA Finals where they once again faced the Los Angeles Lakers and lost the series in seven games.

After deliberating between staying on the job and leaving the job and returning to spend more time with his family in Orlando, Rivers finally decided that he would honor the last year of his contract and return for the 2010–11 season.

On May 13, 2011, after months of rumors that he would retire, ESPN reported that the Celtics and Rivers agreed upon a 5-year contract extension worth $35 million.

On February 6, 2013, Rivers notched his 400th win with the Celtics in a 99–95 victory over the Toronto Raptors.

Los Angeles Clippers (2013–2020)

On June 25, 2013, the Los Angeles Clippers acquired Rivers from the Celtics for an unprotected 2015 NBA first-round draft pick. He also became the senior vice president of basketball operations on the team. In his first season as their head coach, Rivers led the Clippers to a franchise-record 57 wins, garnering the 3rd seed in the Western conference. The 2014 NBA playoffs first round playoff series against the Golden State Warriors was marred when TMZ released an audiotape containing racially insensitive remarks made by the then-Clippers owner Donald Sterling. Though there was a possibility of the Clippers boycotting the series, they would play on, holding a silent protest by leaving their shooting jerseys at center court and obscuring the Clippers logo on their warm-up shirts. Rivers himself stated that he would not return to the Clippers if Sterling remained as owner the following season. NBA commissioner Adam Silver responded to the controversy by banning Sterling from the NBA for life and compelling him to sell the team. After the team was sold to Microsoft CEO Steve Ballmer for $2 billion on August 12, 2014, Rivers remained with the Clippers.

On June 16, 2014, the Clippers promoted Rivers to president of basketball operations in conjunction with his continuing head coaching duties. Although Dave Wohl was hired as general manager, Rivers had the final say in basketball matters. On August 27, 2014, he signed a new five-year contract with the Clippers.

On January 16, 2015, Rivers became the first NBA coach to coach his own son, Austin Rivers, until June 26, 2018, when he was traded to the Washington Wizards for Marcin Gortat.

On August 4, 2017, Rivers gave up his post as president of basketball operations. However, he continued to split responsibility for basketball matters with executive vice president of basketball operations Lawrence Frank. On May 23, 2018, Rivers and the Clippers agreed to a contract extension.

On May 31, 2019, Rivers made comments on Kawhi Leonard during an appearance on ESPN, stating that "He is the most like Jordan that we've seen". The Clippers were fined $50,000 due to Rivers' comments in violation of the league's anti-tampering rule. The Clippers signed Leonard to a three-year contract on July 10, 2019.

In the 2019–20 season, Rivers earned his 900th win as a head coach after the Clippers won at home against the Portland Trail Blazers on November 8, 2019. In the Western Conference seminfinals, the Clippers jumped to a 3–1 lead before losing 4–3 to the Denver Nuggets. Rivers became the first coach in NBA history with three teams who failed to advance from a best-of-seven series after taking a 3–1 lead. He had previously been the only coach in NBA history whose teams had twice failed to advance from a best of seven series after taking a 3–1 lead.

On September 28, 2020, Rivers stepped down following the Clippers' defeat to the Denver Nuggets in the conference semifinals. His record through seven seasons with the team was 356–208, but he was ultimately unable to lead the Clippers to their first conference finals appearance in franchise history.

Philadelphia 76ers (2020–present)
On October 3, 2020, the Philadelphia 76ers announced that they had hired Rivers as their head coach. As the 76ers got off to a 2–0 start in the 2020–21 season, Rivers earned his 945th career win passing Hall of Famer Bill Fitch for 10th on the all-time coaching regular season wins list, with the men ahead of him all having cleared the 1,000-win mark. The 76ers also secured the first seed in the Eastern Conference, and defeated the Washington Wizards in five games in the first round of the playoffs, but lost in the semifinals to the Atlanta Hawks in seven games.

NBA career statistics

Regular season

|-
| style="text-align:left;"|
| style="text-align:left;"|Atlanta
| 81 || 47 || 23.9 || .462 || .167 || .785 || 2.7 || 3.9 || 1.6 || .4 || 9.3
|-
| style="text-align:left;"|
| style="text-align:left;"|Atlanta
| 69 || 58 || 30.8 || .476 || .417 || .770 || 3.1 || 5.9 || 2.4 || .8 || 14.1
|-
| style="text-align:left;"|
| style="text-align:left;"|Atlanta
| 53 || 50 || 29.6 || .474 || .000 || .608 || 3.1 || 8.4 || 2.3 || .2 || 11.5
|-
| style="text-align:left;"|
| style="text-align:left;"|Atlanta
| 82 || 82 || 31.6 || .451 || .190 || .828 || 3.6 || 10.0 || 2.1 || .4 || 12.8
|-
| style="text-align:left;"|
| style="text-align:left;"|Atlanta
| 80 || 80 || 31.3 || .453 || .273 || .758 || 4.6 || 9.3 || 1.8 || .5 || 14.2
|-
| style="text-align:left;"|
| style="text-align:left;"|Atlanta
| 76 || 76 || 32.4 || .455 || .347 || .861 || 3.8 || 6.9 || 2.4 || .5 || 13.6
|-
| style="text-align:left;"|
| style="text-align:left;"|Atlanta
| 48 || 44 || 31.8 || .454 || .364 || .812 || 4.2 || 5.5 || 2.4 || .5 || 12.5
|-
| style="text-align:left;"|
| style="text-align:left;"|Atlanta
| 79 || 79 || 32.7 || .435 || .336 || .844 || 3.2 || 4.3 || 1.9 || .6 || 15.2
|-
| style="text-align:left;"|
| style="text-align:left;"|L.A. Clippers
| 59 || 25 || 28.1 || .424 || .283 || .832 || 2.5 || 3.9 || 1.9 || .3 || 10.9
|-
| style="text-align:left;"|
| style="text-align:left;"|New York
| 77 || 45 || 24.5 || .437 || .317 || .821 || 2.5 || 5.3 || 1.6 || .1 || 7.8
|-
| style="text-align:left;"|
| style="text-align:left;"|New York
| 19 || 19 || 26.3 || .433 || .365 || .636 || 2.1 || 5.3 || 1.3 || .3 || 7.5
|-
| style="text-align:left;"|
| style="text-align:left;"|New York
| 3 || 0 || 15.7 || .308 || .600 || .727 || 3.0 || 2.7 || 1.3 || .0 || 6.3
|-
| style="text-align:left;"|
| style="text-align:left;"|San Antonio
| 60 || 0 || 15.7 || .360 || .344 || .732 || 1.7 || 2.6 || 1.0 || .4 || 5.0
|-
| style="text-align:left;"|
|style="text-align:left;"|San Antonio
| 78 || 0 || 15.8 || .372 || .343 || .750 || 1.8 || 1.6 || .9 || .3 || 4.0
|- class="sortbottom"
| style="text-align:center;" colspan="2"|Career
| 864 || 605 || 27.3 || .444 || .328 || .784 || 3.0 || 5.7 || 1.8 || .4 || 10.9
|- class="sortbottom"
| style="text-align:center;" colspan="2"|All-Star
| 1 || 0 || 16.0 || .500 ||  || .455 || 3.0 || 6.0 ||  ||  || 9.0

Playoffs

|-
| style="text-align:left;"|1984
| style="text-align:left;"|Atlanta
| 5 ||  || 26.0 || .500 || .000 || .878 || 2.0 || 3.2 || 2.4 || .8 || 13.6
|-
| style="text-align:left;"|1986
| style="text-align:left;"|Atlanta
| 9 || 9 || 29.1 || .435 || .500 || .738 || 4.7 || 8.7 || 2.0 || .0 || 12.7
|-
| style="text-align:left;"|1987
| style="text-align:left;"|Atlanta
| 8 || 8 || 30.6 || .383 ||  || .500 || 3.4 || 11.3 || 1.1 || .4 || 7.8
|-
| style="text-align:left;"|1988
| style="text-align:left;"|Atlanta
| 12 || 12 || 34.1 || .511 || .318 || .907 || 4.9 || 9.6 || 2.1 || .2 || 15.7
|-
| style="text-align:left;"|1989
| style="text-align:left;"|Atlanta
| 5 || 5 || 38.2 || .386 || .316 || .708 || 4.8 || 6.8 || 1.4 || .4 || 13.4
|-
| style="text-align:left;"|1991
| style="text-align:left;"|Atlanta
| 5 || 5 || 34.6 || .469 || .091 || .895 || 4.0 || 3.0 || 1.0 || .4 || 15.6
|-
| style="text-align:left;"|1992
| style="text-align:left;"|L.A. Clippers
| 5 || 4 || 37.4 || .446 || .500 || .815 || 3.8 || 4.2 || 1.2 || .0 || 15.2
|-
| style="text-align:left;"|1993
| style="text-align:left;"|New York
| 15 || 15 || 30.5 || .453 || .355 || .767 || 2.6 || 5.7 || 1.9 || .1 || 10.2
|-
| style="text-align:left;"|1995
| style="text-align:left;"|San Antonio
| 15 || 0 || 21.2 || .389 || .370 || .839 || 1.9 || 1.6 || .9 || .6 || 7.8
|-
| style="text-align:left;"|1996
| style="text-align:left;"|San Antonio
| 2 || 0 || 10.0 || .333 || .500 ||  || .5 || .0 || .0 || .0 || 1.5
|- class="sortbottom"
| style="text-align:center;" colspan="2"|Career
| 81 || 58 || 29.5 || .446 || .338 || .767 || 3.3 || 5.9 || 1.5 || .3 || 11.4

Head coaching record

|-
| style="text-align:left;"|Orlando
| style="text-align:left;"|
| 82||41||41|||| style="text-align:center;"|4th in Atlantic|||—||—||—||—
| style="text-align:center;"|Missed playoffs
|-
| style="text-align:left;"|Orlando
| style="text-align:left;"|
| 82||43||39|||| style="text-align:center;"|4th in Atlantic||4||1||3||
| style="text-align:center;"|Lost in First Round
|-
| style="text-align:left;"|Orlando
| style="text-align:left;"|
| 82||44||38|||| style="text-align:center;"|3rd in Atlantic||4||1||3||
| style="text-align:center;"|Lost in First Round
|-
| style="text-align:left;"|Orlando
| style="text-align:left;"|
| 82||42||40|||| style="text-align:center;"|4th in Atlantic||7||3||4||
| style="text-align:center;"|Lost in First Round
|-
| style="text-align:left;"|Orlando
| style="text-align:left;"|
| 11||1||10|||| style="text-align:center;"|(fired)|||—||—||—||—
| style="text-align:center;"|—
|-
| style="text-align:left;"|Boston
| style="text-align:left;"|
| 82||45||37|||| style="text-align:center;"|1st in Atlantic||7||3||4||
| style="text-align:center;"|Lost in First Round
|-
| style="text-align:left;"|Boston
| style="text-align:left;"|
| 82||33||49|||| style="text-align:center;"|3rd in Atlantic|||—||—||—||—
| style="text-align:center;"|Missed playoffs
|-
| style="text-align:left;"|Boston
| style="text-align:left;"|
| 82||24||58|||| style="text-align:center;"|5th in Atlantic||—||—||—||—
| style="text-align:center;"|Missed playoffs
|- style="background:#FDE910;"
| style="text-align:left;"|Boston
| style="text-align:left;"|
| 82||66||16|||| style="text-align:center;"|1st in Atlantic||26||16||10||
| style="text-align:center;"|Won NBA Championship
|-
| style="text-align:left;"|Boston
| style="text-align:left;"|
| 82||62||20|||| style="text-align:center;"|1st in Atlantic||14||7||7||
| style="text-align:center;"|Lost in Conference Semifinals
|-
| style="text-align:left;"|Boston
| style="text-align:left;"|
| 82||50||32|||| style="text-align:center;"|1st in Atlantic||24||15||9||
| style="text-align:center;"|Lost in NBA Finals
|-
| style="text-align:left;"|Boston
| style="text-align:left;"|
| 82||56||26|||| style="text-align:center;"|1st in Atlantic||9||5||4||
| style="text-align:center;"|Lost in Conference Semifinals
|-
| style="text-align:left;"|Boston
| style="text-align:left;"|
| 66||39||27|||| style="text-align:center;"|1st in Atlantic||20||11||9||
| style="text-align:center;"| Lost in Conference Finals
|-
| style="text-align:left;"|Boston
| style="text-align:left;"|
| 81||41||40|||| style="text-align:center;"|3rd in Atlantic||6||2||4||
| style="text-align:center;"| Lost in First Round
|-
| style="text-align:left;"|L.A. Clippers
| style="text-align:left;"|
| 82||57||25|||| style="text-align:center;"|1st in Pacific||13||6||7||
| style="text-align:center;"|Lost in Conference Semifinals
|-
| style="text-align:left;"|L.A. Clippers
| style="text-align:left;"|
| 82||56||26||||style="text-align:center;"|2nd in Pacific||14||7||7||
| style="text-align:center;"|Lost in Conference Semifinals
|-
| style="text-align:left;"|L.A. Clippers
| style="text-align:left;"|
| 82||53||29||||style="text-align:center;"|2nd in Pacific||6||2||4||
| style="text-align:center;"|Lost in First Round
|-
| style="text-align:left;"|L.A. Clippers
| style="text-align:left;"|
| 82||51||31||||style="text-align:center;"|2nd in Pacific||7||3||4||
| style="text-align:center;"|Lost in First Round
|-
| style="text-align:left;"|L.A. Clippers
| style="text-align:left;"|
| 82||42||40||||style="text-align:center;"|2nd in Pacific||—||—||—||—
| style="text-align:center;"|Missed playoffs
|-
| style="text-align:left;"|L.A. Clippers
| style="text-align:left;"|
| 82||48||34||||style="text-align:center;"|2nd in Pacific||6||2||4||
| style="text-align:center;"|Lost in First Round
|-
| style="text-align:left;"|L.A. Clippers
| style="text-align:left;"|
| 72||49||23||||style="text-align:center;"|2nd in Pacific||13||7||6||
| style="text-align:center;"| Lost in Conference Semifinals
|-
| style="text-align:left;"|Philadelphia
| style="text-align:left;"|
| 72||49||23||||style="text-align:center;"|1st in Atlantic||12||7||5||
| style="text-align:center;"| Lost in Conference Semifinals
|-
| style="text-align:left;"|Philadelphia
| style="text-align:left;"|
| 82||51||31||||style="text-align:center;"|2nd in Atlantic||12||6||6||
| style="text-align:center;"|Lost in Conference Semifinals
|- class="sortbottom"
| style="text-align:center;" colspan="2"|Career
| 1,778||1,043||735|||| ||204||104||100||||

Personal life
Rivers is the nephew of former NBA player Jim Brewer. Doc met his wife Kristin on a blind date setup by Brewer’s dad.  Doc and Kris have four children. His oldest son, Jeremiah, played basketball at Georgetown University and Indiana University, and has played in the NBA D-League for the Maine Red Claws. His daughter Callie played volleyball for the University of Florida and is married to NBA player Seth Curry. Rivers's son Austin is an NBA player who currently plays for the Minnesota Timberwolves. His youngest son, Spencer, is a guard who played for Winter Park High School and for UC Irvine.

Rivers became good friends with Major League Baseball (MLB) Hall of Fame pitcher John Smoltz during his tenure with the Hawks. In 2009, Rivers was credited with helping lure Smoltz to signing with the Boston Red Sox while he was the head coach of the Celtics.
 
Rivers is a cousin of former NBA guard Byron Irvin and former MLB outfielder Ken Singleton.

Rivers has attention deficit hyperactivity disorder.

Rivers is a member of the National Advisory Board for Positive Coaching Alliance, a national non-profit organization that helps student-athletes and their coaches.

See also

List of National Basketball Association career steals leaders
List of National Basketball Association players with most assists in a game
List of National Basketball Association players with most steals in a game

References

External links

 Coaching stats  at Basketball-Reference.com
 Coach bio at NBA.com

1961 births
Living people
African-American basketball coaches
African-American basketball players
American men's basketball coaches
American men's basketball players
Atlanta Hawks draft picks
Atlanta Hawks players
Basketball coaches from Illinois
Boston Celtics head coaches
Curry family
Los Angeles Clippers players
Los Angeles Clippers head coaches
Los Angeles Clippers executives
Marquette Golden Eagles men's basketball players
McDonald's High School All-Americans
National Basketball Association All-Stars
National Basketball Association broadcasters
National Basketball Association championship-winning head coaches
New York Knicks players
Orlando Magic head coaches
Parade High School All-Americans (boys' basketball)
Point guards
San Antonio Spurs players
Sportspeople from Winter Park, Florida
United States men's national basketball team players
Basketball players from Chicago
21st-century African-American people
20th-century African-American sportspeople
1982 FIBA World Championship players